Rabi Banerjee (4 March 1951 – 9 June 2021) was an Indian cricketer. He played ten first-class matches for Bengal between 1969 and 1975. He died on 9 June 2021 at the age of 70 due to a prolonged illness at a city hospital in Kolkata. Prior to his death, he had contracted COVID-19 and recovered from it.

See also
 List of Bengal cricketers

References

External links
 

1951 births
2021 deaths
Indian cricketers
Bengal cricketers
Cricketers from Kolkata